The Battle of Al-Safra, took place in 1812 when Tusun Pasha's forces with its artillery and equipment moved forward trying to recapture Medina and met with Saud Al-Kabeer forces in a Valley of Al-Safra (the yellow Valley). Saud's army started attacking the Ottomans with 200 cavalry and about 10,000 men and successfully defended Medina. After three days of fighting the Ottomans withdrew back to their bunker in Yanbu.

References

Al-Safra
Al-Safra
First Saudi State
Al-Safra
Al-Safra
1812 in the Ottoman Empire
19th century in Saudi Arabia